The following is a list of notable deaths in December 1996.

Entries for each day are listed alphabetically by surname. A typical entry lists information in the following sequence:
 Name, age, country of citizenship at birth, subsequent country of citizenship (if applicable), reason for notability, cause of death (if known), and reference.

December 1996

1
Peter Bronfman, 67, Canadian businessman and entrepreneur, cancer.
Alan Coldham, 90, Australian tennis player.
Sonia Furió, 59, Spanish-Mexican actress, singer, and dancer.
Irving Gordon, 81, American songwriter, myeloma cancer.
Jacek Gutowski, 36, Polish weightlifter.
James Record, 77, American politician and author.
Jan G. Waldenström, 90, Swedish physician.

2
Jules Bastin, 63, Belgian operatic bass.
Jean Jérôme Hamer, 80, Belgian Roman Catholic cardinal.
Mike Morgan, 54, American gridiron football player.
Marri Chenna Reddy, 77, Indian politician.

3
John Bateman, 56, American Major League baseball player.
Georges Duby, 77, French historian, cancer.
Norm Houser, 80, American racing driver.
Babrak Karmal, 67, Afghan revolutionary and President of Afghanistan, liver cancer.
Solveig von Schoultz, 89, Finnish writer, novelist, and teacher.

4
Syd Heylen,76, Australian actor, comedian, and variety performer, stroke.
Willard Parker, 84, American actor, heart attack.
Leon Polk Smith, 90, American painter.
Albert Winsemius, 86, Dutch economist, pneumonia.
Ans Wortel, 67, Dutch painter, poet and writer.
Jan Čuřík, 72, Czech cinematographer.

5
Robert Brewer, 72, United States Army officer during World War II.
Wilf Carter, 91, Canadian Country and Western singer, songwriter, and yodeller, stomach cancer.
Karl H. Fell, 59, German politician.
Cliff Mapes, 74, American baseball player.
Carey Spicer, 87, American football and basketball player and coach.
Adolf Bredo Stabell, 88, Norwegian diplomat.

6
Harry Babcock, 66, American gridiron football player.
Jean Bertholle, 87, French painter.
Victor Bruns, 92, German composer and bassoonist.
ʿAbd al-Hamid Kishk, 63, Egyptian preacher, scholar of Islam, activist, and author.
Robert Lees, 74, American linguist.
Ricky Owens, 57, American singer.
Pete Rozelle, 70, American commissioner of the National Football League, brain cancer.

7
José Donoso, 72, Chilean writer, journalist and professor, liver cancer.
Johnny Hall, 79, American gridiron football player.
Ali Hatami, 52, Iranian film director, screenwriter, art director, and costume designer, pancreatic cancer.
Giuseppe Perego, 81, Italian comics artist.
Phillip Reed, 88, American actor.
Ryszard Szymczak, 51, Polish football player.

8
Rolf Blomberg, 84, Swedish explorer, writer, photographer and producer of documentary films.
Prince Eugenio, Duke of Genoa, 90, Italian prince.
Espanto III, 56, Mexican professional wrestler, heart attack.
José Luis González, 70, Puerto Rican essayist, novelist, and journalist.
Jack H. Hexter, 86, American historian.
Tommy Lahiff, 86, Australian rules football player.
John Langeloth Loeb Sr., 94, American investor and executive.
Paulene Myers, 83, American actress (Lady Sings the Blues, The Sting, My Cousin Vinny).
Johnny Olszewski, 66, American gridiron football player.
Howard Rollins, 46, American actor (Ragtime, In the Heat of the Night, A Soldier's Story), complications from AIDS-related lymphoma.
Dorothy Schroeder, 68, American baseball player, intracranial aneurysm.
Marin Sorescu, 60, Romanian poet, playwright, and novelist, heart attack.
Kashiwado Tsuyoshi, 58, Japanese sumo wrestler, liver failure.

9
June Carlson, 72, American actress, aneurysm.
Patty Donahue, 40, American vocalist of new wave group the Waitresses, lung cancer.
Li Ki-joo, 70, South Korean football player.
Mary Leakey, 83, British paleoanthropologist.
Diana Morgan, 88, British playwright and screenwriter.
Alain Poher, 87, French politician.
Ivor Roberts-Jones, 83, British sculptor.
Raphael Samuel, 61, British Marxist historian and intellectual.
Woody Woodard, 79, American gridiron football player and coach, basketball coach, track coach, college athletics administrator.

10
Jakov Blažević, 84, Croatian lawyer and politician.
John Duffey, 62, American bluegrass musician, heart attack.
John Price, 83, Danish film actor and director, and the father of Danish screenwriter Adam Price.
Richa Sharma, 32, Indian actress.
Eric Webber, 76, English football player and manager.
Faron Young, 64, American country music producer, singer and songwriter, suicide.

11
Juan Carlos Barbieri, 64, Argentine actor.
Des Booth, 76, Australian politician.
Charles Hamilton, 82, American paleographer, handwriting expert and author.
Willie Rushton, 59, English cartoonist, comedian, and actor, heart attack.
W. G. G. Duncan Smith, 82, British Royal Air Force flying ace during World War II.
Marie-Claude Vaillant-Couturier, 84, French photojournalist and politician, cancer.

12
Larry Gates, 81, American actor (Guiding Light, Cat on a Hot Tin Roof, In the Heat of the Night).
George Jumonville, 79, American Major League Baseball player.
Buks Marais, 68, South African rugby player.
Vance Packard, 82, American journalist, social critic, and author.

13
Waheed Akhtar, 62, Indian poet, writer, critic, and a Muslim scholar and philosopher.
Mae Barnes, 89, American jazz singer, dancer and comic entertainer.
Edward Blishen, 76, English author and broadcaster.
James Cassels, 89, British Army officer.
Francesco Gabrieli, 92, Italian arabist.
Arthur Jacobs, 74, British music critic and musicologist.
Eulace Peacock, 82, American sprinter, Alzheimer's disease.
Clarence Wijewardena, 53, Sri Lankan singer, composer and musician, liver cirrhosis.
Cao Yu, 86, Chinese playwright.

14
John Craven, 49, English football player, heart attack.
Howard B. Keck, 83, American businessman and Thoroughbred racehorse owner and breeder.
Andy McLaren, 74, Scottish football player.
Gaston Miron, 68, French Canadian writer.

15
Dawn Crosby, 33, American heavy metal singer, liver failure from substance abuse.
Giuseppe Dossetti, 83, Italian jurist, politician, and Catholic priest.
Dave Kaye, 90, English pianist.
Harry Kemelman, 88, American mystery writer and a professor of English, kidney failure.
Tristan Keuris, 50, Dutch composer.
Adalberto López, 73, Mexican football player.
Laurens van der Post, 90, South African Afrikaner author, farmer, journalist, philosopher, explorer and conservationist.

16
Quentin Bell, 86, English biographer and art historian.
Sven Bergqvist, 82, Swedish football and ice hockey player,.
George M. Jones, 85, United States Army brigadier general.
Dolores Medio, 85, Spanish writer.
Carlo Reguzzoni, 88, Italian football player.
Arthur Shores, 92, American civil rights attorney.

17
Armando, 26, American house music producer and DJ, leukemia.
Wayne Barlow, 84, American composer of classical music.
Li Han-hsiang, 70, Chinese film director, heart attack.
Johannes Kaiser, 60, German sprinter.
Adriaan Maas, 89, Dutch sailor and Olympian.
Lawrie Miller, 73, New Zealand cricket player.
Ruby Murray, 61, Northern Irish singer and actress, liver cancer.
George Pfann, 94, American gridiron football player and coach.
İlyas Seçkin, 78, Turkish politician.
Stanko Todorov, 76, Bulgarian communist politician.
Sun Yaoting, 92, last imperial Chinese eunuch.

18
Irving Caesar, 101, American lyricist and theater composer.
Charles Deaton, 75, American architect.
Gwilym Hugh Lewis, 99, British flying ace during World War I.
Ayşe Şan, 58, Kurdish singer.
Suryakantam, 72, Indian actress.

19
Bobby Cole, 64, American musician, heart attack.
Ted Darling, 61, Canadian sportscaster, Pick disease.
Ejvind Hansen, 72, Danish sprint canoeist.
Ronald Howard, 78, English actor and writer.
Amata Kabua, 68, President of the Marshall Islands (1979–1996).
Yulii Borisovich Khariton, 92, Russian nuclear physicist.
Marcello Mastroianni, 72, Italian actor (La Dolce Vita, 8½, Divorce Italian Style), pancreatic cancer.

20
Melio Bettina, 80, American boxer.
Osvaldo Lira, 92, Chilean priest, philosopher and theologian.
Thakin Lwin, 82, Burmese politician, trade unionist, writer and journalist.
Charles Morton, 80, American racing cyclist and Olympian.
Carl Sagan, 62, American astronomer, astrophysicist, and author (Cosmos, Contact), pneumonia.

21
Kell Areskoug, 90 Swedish Olympic sprinter.
Christine Brückner, 75, German writer.
Clarence Gosse, 84, Canadian politician.
Barry Gray, 80, American radio personality, known as "The father of Talk Radio".
Kálmán Hazai, 83, Hungarian water polo player.
Margret Rey, 90, German-American children's author and illustrator, heart attack.
Alfred Tonello, 67, French racing cyclist.

22
Oscar Alende, 87, Argentine politician.
Mária Bartuszová, 60, Slovakian sculptor.
Nealie Duggan, 73, Irish Gaelic football player.
Fred Green, 63, American baseball player.
Chiang Hsiao-yung, 48, Taiwanese politician, esophageal cancer.
Don Meade, 83, American National Champion jockey.
Igor Oberberg, 89, Russian Empire-born German cinematographer.

23
Aram Karamanoukian, 86, Syrian Army Lieutenant General, politician and author.
Rina Ketty, 85, Italian singer.
Vicente González Lizondo, 54, Spanish politician, heart attack.
Mića Popović, 73, Serbian artist.
Ronnie Scott, 69, British jazz tenor saxophonist and jazz club owner, accidental overdose of barbiturate.
Infanta Maria Cristina of Spain, 85, Spanish princess, heart attack.
Emrys Thomas, 96, Welsh socialist politician.
Sophie Toscan du Plantier, 39, French television producer, beaten to death.

24
Al Adair, 67, Canadian politician and baseball player, heart attack.
Takeo Doi, 92, Japanese aircraft designer.
Leonard Firestone, 89, American businessman, diplomat, and philanthropist.
Bobby Robinson, 46, Scottish football player.
Nguyen Huu Tho, 86, Vietnamese revolutionary and politician.
Milan Vasojević, 63, Serbian basketball coach.

25
Lee Alexander, 69, American politician, cancer.
Tony Dauksza, 84, American football player, film-maker, and outdoorsman.
Roger Duchesne, 90, French actor.
Bill Hewitt, 68, Canadian sportscaster, heart attack.
Bill Osmanski, 80, American gridiron football player and coach.
Al Schottelkotte, 69, American news anchor and reporter, cancer.
Sue Bailey Thurman, 93, American author, historian and civil rights activist.
Clayton Tonnemaker, 68, American gridiron football player.
Harry Watson, 92, New Zealand racing cyclist.
August Wenzinger, 91, Swiss musician and conductor.

26
Narcís Jubany Arnau, 83, Spanish Catholic cardinal.
Ray Bray, 79, American gridiron football player.
Michael Bruno, 64, Israeli economist, cancer.
Frank Edwin Egler, 85, American plant ecologist.
Frank Liebel, 77, American National Football League player.
Misha Mahowald, 33, American computational neuroscientist, suicide.
JonBenét Ramsey, 6, American child beauty queen, asphyxia by strangulation and craniocerebral trauma.
Morris Schapiro, 83, American investment banker and chess master.
Olle Tandberg, 78, Swedish boxer.

27
Gene Brabender, 55, American Major League Baseball pitcher, brain aneurysm.
Mary Celine Fasenmyer, 90, American mathematician.
Johnny Heartsman, 60, American blues musician and songwriter, stroke.
Gabriel Loire, 92, French French stained glass artist.
Julián Mateos, 58, Spanish actor and film producer, lung cancer.
Kourkène Medzadourian, 88, Armenian activist.
Nicolae Militaru, 71, Romanian soldier and communist politician, cancer.
Neil O'Donnell, 82, American basketball player.
Juan José Ortega, 92, Mexican film director, producer and screenwriter.
Sarmad Sindhi, 35, Pakistani folk singer and songwriter, traffic accident.
Jean-Claude Tramont, 62, Belgian film director.

28
Edward Carfagno, 89, American fencer and art director (Ben-Hur, The Bad and the Beautiful, Soylent Green), Oscar winner (1953, 1954, 1960).
Ferd Dreher, 83, American gridiron football player.
Katherine Pollak Ellickson, 91, American labor economist.
Edward Gerard Hettinger, 94, American Roman Catholic clergyman and bishop.
Annik Shefrazian, 86-87, Iranian Armenian actress.

29
Alma Birk, 79, British journalist and politician.
Pennar Davies, 85, British writer.
Mireille Hartuch, 90, French singer, composer, and actress.
Margaret Herbison, 89, Scottish politician, cancer.
Jerry Knight, 44, American R&B vocalist and bassist, cancer.
Dorothy Livesay, 87, Canadian poet.
Daniel Mayer, 87, French politician and member of the French Resistance.
Robert J. Morris, 82, American anti-Communist activist, heart failure.
Vasily Ilyich Mykhlik, 74, Soviet Air Forces pilot and Hero of the Soviet Union.
Tom Pedi, 83, American actor.
Gino Sinimberghi, 83, Italian opera singer.
Oswald Szemerényi, 83, Hungarian linguist.

30
Pokey Allen, 53, American gridiron football player and coach.
Lew Ayres, 88, American actor (All Quiet on the Western Front, Dr. Kildare, Johnny Belinda).
Lou Barle, 80, American basketball player.
Erik Heiberg, 80, Norwegian sailor and Olympic medalist.
Jack Nance, 53, American actor (Eraserhead, Twin Peaks, Dune), subdural hematoma.
Lev Oshanin, 84, Russian poet, playwright and writer.
Broome Pinniger, 94, Indian field hockey player.
Keith A. Walker, 61, American writer, film producer, actor (The Fall Guy, The Goonies, Free Willy), cancer.

31
Wesley Addy, 83, American actor.
Annie Ducaux, 88, French actress.
Sam Narron, 83, American baseball player and coach.
Michael Roberts, 88, British historian of early modern Sweden.
Winston P. Wilson, 85, United States Air Force major general.

References 

1996-12
 12